Adriaan Botha may refer to:
 Adriaan Botha (sprinter)
 Adriaan Botha (SAAF officer)

See also
 Riaan Botha, South African pole vaulter